Joyrex J4 EP is an EP by Richard D. James under the alias Caustic Window. The release is a 12 inch vinyl and has been pressed with both yellow and black labels.

All tracks except "Pop Corn" were later re-released on the album Compilation.

Track listing

Side A
"Joyrex J4" – 4:27
"Pop Corn" – 3:38
"AFX 114" – 1:20

Side B
"Cordialatron" – 4:43
"Italic Eyeball" – 4:24
"Pigeon Street" – 0:21
No track titles appear anywhere on the release; however, track titles came from the later release of Compilation, except for "Pop Corn" which is so called by fan-interpretation of the song written by Gershon Kingsley.

References

Aphex Twin EPs
1992 EPs